SCQ may refer to

 Special composition question, in philosophy
 Santiago de Compostela Airport, Spain
 Star Circle Quest, a Filipino TV series
 Sa'och language, ISO 639-3 code